Waterford is an electoral district of the Legislative Assembly in the Australian state of Queensland.

The district is based in the central urban suburbs of Logan City. It is named for the suburb of Waterford and also includes the suburbs of  Bethania, Edens Landing, Kingston, Holmview, Loganholme, Loganlea, Meadowbrook, Slacks Creek, Tanah Merah and Waterford West. The electorate was first created for the 1992 election.

Members for Waterford

Election results

References

External links
 

Waterford